Dendrosipanea is a genus of flowering plants in the family Rubiaceae. The genus is found in Brazil and Venezuela.

Species 
 Dendrosipanea revoluta Steyerm. - Amazonas, Venezuela
 Dendrosipanea spigelioides Ducke - southern Venezuela, northern Brazil

References

External links 
 Kew World Checklist of Selected Plant Families, Dendrosipanea

Rubiaceae genera
Sipaneeae
Taxa named by Adolpho Ducke